Rhagastis diehli is a moth of the  family Sphingidae. It is known from Sumatra.

References

Rhagastis
Moths described in 2010